Langebergia is a genus of South African flowering plants in the tribe Gnaphalieae within the family Asteraceae.

Species
There is only one known species, Langebergia canescens, native to the Western Cape Province.

References

Gnaphalieae
Endemic flora of South Africa
Monotypic Asteraceae genera